Nina Badrić (born 4 July 1972) is a Croatian pop singer and songwriter. She began performing in the early 1990s, and competed in "Dora" – the Croatian selection for Eurovision Song Contest 4 times. She won 7th place in 1993 with "Ostavljam te", 10th place in 1994 with "Godine nestvarne", 18th place in 1995 with "Odlaziš zauvijek", and second place in 2003 with "Čarobno jutro". Badrić eventually represented Croatia in the Eurovision Song Contest 2012 in Baku, Azerbaijan with the song "Nebo". She finished 12th in the second semi-final and failed to qualify for the grand final.

Early life
Badrić attended primary school "Otokar Keršovani", and started singing in the children's choir Zvjezdice at the age of nine. She spent seven years in the choir, while she began doing backing vocals with performers such as the Parni valjak, Prljavo kazalište and others.

Career

Early career
In the early 1990s she was discovered by Dino Dvornik who helped develop her career. Later, she had her first major appearance on 'Crovizija', where she won with the song "Ostavljam te", in collaboration with Rajko Dujmić, Jesenko Houra and her first manager Daniel Koletić. Shortly after that she signed her first professional contract with Croatia Records and in 1995 released her first album Godine nestvarne. However, Nina made first major success in duet with singer Emilija Kokić and the song "Ja sam vlak".
Badrić released her second album Personality in 1997, the record label Top Zoe Music. Nina won two Porins for best female vocal performance and best album of pop and classical music. She has also finished the song "I'm So Excited" by American R&B group The Pointer Sisters, bringing a degree of international recognition. In 1999 she released the 13 track album Unique, including two versions of the song, "Woman in Love" and also a remix of "Po dobru ti me pamti". She collaborated with a number of Croatian musicians, including Boytronic.

2000–present
With the single "Nek ti bude kao meni", Nina announced her fourth album, Nina, released in 2000, through the label Croatia Records. It contained twelve songs and was produced by Darko Juranović It featured the second single "Ako kažeš da me ne voliš" that was supported by a video. In 2003 she released a compilation, Collection, and her fourth studio album Ljubav, consisting of thirteen tracks. The songs "Čarobno jutro" and "Za dobre i loše dane" were released as singles.

On 14 February 2005, Badrić performed at the Dom sportova in Zagreb, in support of the campaign by UNICEF to house abandoned children. The concert was filmed and the same year Badrić released live album on double CD, Ljubav za ljubav – Live, released through the Aquarius Records. In November 2007, she released her seventh studio album,  07. The album opens with the song "Kralj života mog", which isa duet with Roma diva Ljiljana Petrović-Buttler. The material contains another duet with Montell Jordan in the song "Do not give this to anyone". The album was recorded over two years and produced by Steve Sidwell. In November 2011 Nina released the album Nebo.

Badrić represented Croatia at the Eurovision Song Contest 2012 in Baku, Azerbaijan with the song "Nebo" (Heaven). She performed in the second semi-final and failed to reach the top ten and final cutoff, at 12th place with 42 points.

After the Eurovision Song Contest Badrić embarked on an arena tour of the region. In 2013 Badrić recorded a duet "Duše su se srele" with Bosnian singer Mirza Šoljanin. In January 2015, she recorded another duet, called "Lozinka za raj", with Serbian singer Željko Vasić. In 2016 Badrić recorded a song "Želim živjeti" (I want to live) together with Shorty, Ivana Husar, Marija Husar, Palić Sisters, Alan Hržica and band Emanuel in support of an anti-abortion campaign. In July 2016 Badrić performed her song "Dani i godine" at the wedding of Ana Ivanovic and Bastian Schweinsteiger.

Personal life
She married Bernard Krasnić in 2006; they divorced in 2012. During campaign for the 2007 parliamentary election, Badrić performed at a number fundraising events for the Croatian Democratic Union. She is a devout Roman Catholic.
She often makes pilgrimages to Lourdes, Međugorje and Šurkovac.

Discography

Studio albums
Godine nestvarne (Croatia, 1995)
Personality (Zg Zoe Music, 1997)
Unique (Croatia, 1999)
Nina (Croatia, 2000)
Ljubav (Aquarius, 2003)
07 (Aquarius, 2007)
NeBo (Aquarius, 2011)

Singles

See also
List of contraltos in non-classical music
Popular music in Croatia

References

External links

1972 births
Living people
Musicians from Zagreb
21st-century Croatian women singers
20th-century Croatian women singers
Croatian pop singers
Eurovision Song Contest entrants for Croatia
Eurovision Song Contest entrants of 2012
Hayat Production artists
Croatian voice actresses